ILSE can refer to:

 International Life Saving Federation of Europe - the European branch of the International Life Saving Federation.
 IntraLase - medical laser company.
 Instituto Libre de Segunda Enseñanza - a high-school in Buenos Aires, Argentina.